Table for Five is a 1983 American drama film directed by Robert Lieberman and starring Jon Voight and Richard Crenna.

Plot
J.P. Tannen (Voight) is a former professional golfer residing in California. He is estranged from his three children, who live in New York with their mother Kathleen (Millie Perkins) and stepfather, attorney Mitchell (Crenna). In an effort to re-enter his kids’ lives, Tannen decides to take them on a Mediterranean cruise. Tannen, who still has feelings for Kathleen, wants her to believe he's a changed man, but she's not convinced.

On the cruise, Tannen is distracted by the prospect of picking up women, including French archaeologist Marie (Marie-Christine Barrault), often leaving the kids to fend for themselves for entertainment. He reserves a table for five in the dining room, secretly expecting to find an adult female companion for the fifth chair.

Youngest son Truman-Paul (Robby Kiger) has a learning disability, which Tannen impatiently pushes him to overcome. Adopted oldest son Trung (Son Hoang Bui) is caught stealing food from the ship's galley and trying to order drinks with a phony ID. Their sister Tilde (Roxana Zal) is a sensible and sensitive girl, but much too young to act as a parental influence to the boys.

Tannen begins to feel he can't function as a traditional father, so he suggests that the kids think of him as a "friend," even calling him "J.P." The trip temporarily gets back on track with the ship's first port-of-call, Rome. The family has fun together and Marie is impressed by what she witnesses of Tannen as a caring parent.

But while en route to their next stop, Athens, Tannen receives devastating news. Kathleen has been killed in a car accident in New York while taking the family dog to the vet. Grief-stricken, he is met in Athens by the children's stepfather, Mitchell, who explains that he went ahead and buried Kathleen, then flew to Europe to escort the children home, where a memorial service would later be held.

Tannen insists on telling the kids himself, demanding more time. Mitchell tries to talk him out of this, but ultimately agrees to leave the kids with their father for a while longer.

The ship moves on to Cairo. With the kids sightseeing, Tannen meets with Mitchell again in a local tavern, to tell him that he has begun to consider pursuing full custody of the children. Their conversation escalates into a profanity-laced argument. Mitchell points out what an absentee parent Tannen has been, not even knowing the names of his children's friends or teachers. He hints at knowledge of Tannen's unsuccessful business dealings and vows to use his capacity as a lawyer to ruin him.

Tannen confesses to Marie the truth about how little time he actually has given his kids over the years. Marie joins the family on a trip to the Pyramids. It is there that Tannen finally breaks down and informs the kids that their mother has died. The children are devastated.

At the next stop, Tunis, Trung runs away. He takes the first launch to shore, with the intention to work his way back to the U.S. Tilde tells her father that Trung has a history of running away, yet another fact he didn't know. They discover him in a marketplace and catch up to him after a chase. Tannen forces the boy to open up to him, whereupon Trung tells him angrily that he needs Tannen as a father, not a "friend."

Mitchell is waiting in Genoa, prepared to take the kids back to the United States and their home. As gently as he knows how, Tannen informs Mitchell that he is keeping them. He then rattles off a list of the kids' friends and teachers, showing Mitchell that he is determined to be more in tune with their lives.

Cast

Production
The film uses location shooting extensively. For the cruise scenes, producers chose the MS Vistafjord (now with the Saga Cruise Line), which at the time was considered the most luxurious cruise ship in the Western Hemisphere. Many scenes were shot at sea during an actual voyage. Others were shot on location in Rome, Athens, and at the Giza pyramids.

The film opened in the United States on February 19, 1983.

Kevin Costner has a small role as a passenger on the ship, a newlywed.

Release
Table for Five was released in the United States on February 18, 1983. In the Philippines, the film was renamed The Champ: Second Chance, to connect the film with Jon Voight's unrelated earlier project The Champ, and premiered on December 16, 1987.

References

External links
 
 
 

1983 films
1983 drama films
American drama films
CBS Theatrical Films films
1980s English-language films
Films scored by John Morris
1983 directorial debut films
Films directed by Robert Lieberman
Films scored by Miles Goodman
1980s American films
English-language drama films